Florian Meyer may refer to:

 Florian Meyer (referee) (born 1968), German referee
 Florian Meyer (footballer) (born 1987), German footballer

See also
 Florian Mayer (born 1983), German tennis player
 Florian Maier (born 1992), Austrian footballer